The Crescentii (in modern Italian Crescenzi) were a baronial family, attested in Rome from the beginning of the 10th century and which in fact ruled the city and the election of the popes until the beginning of the 11th century.

History

Several individuals named Crescentius who appear in the very scanty documentation of the period have been grouped together by historians as the "Crescentii." Some do seem to bear family relationships, falling into two main branches, the Ottaviani and the Stefaniani, and their policies were consistent enough, especially as regards confronting the rival gang of aristocratic thugs, the Tusculani, who were descended from the influential curial official Theophylact, Count of Tusculum, ruler of Rome at the beginning of the 10th century.  Their territorial strongholds were situated mainly in the Sabine Hills.

The Crescentii had another formidable enemy, whose power did not always extend to Rome, in the German kings and emperors of the Ottonian Saxon dynasty, notably Otto the Great and Henry II. Emperor Otto's intervention in Italian affairs in 961 was not in Crescentii interests. In February 962, the pope and the emperor ratified the Diploma Ottonianum, in which the emperor became the guarantor of the independence of the papal states. It was the Crescentii who most threatened papal independence.

The clan's triumph was in the later 10th century. They produced one pope from among their number — John XIII — and controlled most of the others, whom the leaders of the Crescentii installed as puppet popes. They held the secular offices such as praefectus by which Rome was technically still governed, and exacted large contributions and donations from the Papal treasury, in a thinly disguised extortion. From this power base within the city, they were able to influence even those popes who had not been their direct candidates.

In the countryside, Crescentii castles concentrated a cluster of population that depended on them for their defense and were dependable armed members of the Crescentii clientage.

After Sergius IV's death (1012), the Crescentii simply installed their candidate, Gregory, in the Lateran, without the assent of the cardinals. A struggle flared between the Crescentii and the rival Tusculani. The failure of their bold attempt and the pontificate of the Tusculan pope Benedict VIII, whose powerful protector was the King of the Germans, Henry II, whom he crowned Emperor in Rome in 1014, forced the Crescentii out of Rome, retreating to the fortified strongholds. In the 1020s, the abbot Hugh of Farfa was able to play one branch of Crescentii against another, and Crescentii support of two unsuccessful antipopes in mid-century, Sylvester III (Pope in 1045) and Benedict X in 1058 were symptoms of the clan's loss of unity and political prestige. As landowners, they settled into more local forms of patronage, as the Crescenzi. 

The last known member of the family was Cardinal Marcello Crescenzi who died in 1768.

Notable members
 Crescentius the Elder (d.984)
 Crescentius the Younger (d.998)
 John Crescentius (d.1012)

Notes

References
Luscombe, David and Riley-Smith, Jonathan. 2004. New Cambridge Medieval History: C.1024-c.1198, Volume 4.

External links
The Waiting Game: The Twenty-First and Eleventh Centuries Compared - by John C. Rao
Famiglia Crescenzi

10th-century Christianity
11th-century Catholicism
History of the papacy
Medieval Rome
Papal families
Families of post-ancient Rome